The term post-processing (or postproc for short) is used in the video/film business for quality-improvement image processing (specifically digital image processing) methods used in video playback devices, such as stand-alone DVD-Video players; video playing software; and transcoding software.  It is also commonly used in real-time 3D rendering (such as in video games) to add additional effects.

Uses in video production
Video post-processing is the process of changing the perceived quality of a video on playback (done after the decoding process). Image scaling routines such as linear interpolation, bilinear interpolation, or cubic interpolation can for example be performed when increasing the size of images; this involves either subsampling (reducing or shrinking an image) or zooming (enlarging an image). This helps reduce or hide image artifacts and flaws in the original film material. It is important to understand that post-processing always involves a trade-off between speed, smoothness and sharpness.
Image scaling and multivariate interpolation:
Nearest-neighbor interpolation
linear interpolation
bilinear interpolation
cubic interpolation
bicubic interpolation
Bézier surface
Lanczos resampling
trilinear interpolation
 Tricubic interpolation
 SPP (Statistical-Post-Processing)
 Deblocking
 Deringing
 Sharpen / Unsharpen (often referred to as "soften")
 Requantization
 Luminance alterations
 Blurring / denoising 
 Deinterlacing
weave deinterlace method
bob deinterlace method
linear deinterlace method
yadif deinterlace method
 Deflicking
 2:3 pull-down / ivtc (inverse telecine) for conversion from 24 frames/s and 23.976 frames/s to 30 frames/s and 29.97 frames/s
 3:2 pull-up (telecine conversion) for conversion from 30 frames/s and 29.97 frames/s to 24 frames/s and 23.976 frames/s

Uses in 3D rendering

Additionally, post-processing is commonly used in 3D rendering, especially for video games.  Instead of rendering 3D objects directly to the display, the scene is first rendered to a buffer in the memory of the video card.  Pixel shaders and optionally vertex shaders are then used to apply post-processing filters to the image buffer before displaying it to the screen. Some post-processing effects also require multiple-passes, gamma inputs, vertex manipulation, and depth buffer access. Post-processing allows effects to be used that require awareness of the entire image (since normally each 3D object is rendered in isolation). Such effects include:

 Ambient occlusion (HBAO, Screen space ambient occlusion (SSAO, reflections), etc.
 Anaglyph
 Anti-aliasing (FXAA, AGAA, SMAA, MLAA, and custom anti-aliasing methods—not sample-size AA like MSAA and SSAA)
 Bloom
 Blur (depth of field, motion blur, smart)
 Bloodlust effect (red vignetting with particles, etc.)
 Bokeh
 Bump mapping
 Cel shading
 Chromatic aberration
 Color correction
 Color grading
 Contrast adjustment
 Dynamic contrast
 Crepuscular rays
 Digital camera light compensation
 Dithering (including subpixel)
 Eye adaptation
 Film grain
 Filmic scene tone mapping
 Fog/mist
 Gamma correction
 Global illumination
 Glow
 Grayscale
 Haze (depth, heat)
 High-dynamic-range rendering
 Image distortion
 Infrared
 Lens flare (cubic lens distortion flare, pseudo lens flare)
 Light scattering
 Nightvision
 Outlines
 Particle effects
 Pixel vibrance
 Point light attenuation
 Posterization and deposterization
 Scanline
 Screen borders
 Screen rotation 
 Shading (ink, paint, sketch)
 Shadow mapping
 Sepia tone
 Sharpen/unsharpen (texture unsharp mask, LumaSharpen, sharpen, sharpen complex 1/2, adaptive-sharpen)
 Sobel operator
 Split screen
 Upscaling (i.e. xBR, Super xBR, SuperRes)
 Texture filtering (point, linear, bilinear, trilinear, anisotropic, and custom algorithms)
 Vignette

See also
 Post-production
 Pixel-art scaling algorithms

References

External links
 Videotranscoding Wiki -(documentation on server-side usage of MPlayer for transcoding)

Video processing